Chill factor may refer to:
Wind chill factor, a meteorological measurement

Film 
Chill Factor (1988 film),  1988 New Zealand action film
Chill Factor (film),  1999 American action film starring Cuba Gooding Jr. and Skeet Ulrich
A Cold Night's Death, a 1973 American made-for-TV film, also called The Chill Factor

Other uses 
Chill Factor (novel), a 1992 science fiction novel by Laurence James (James Axler)
Chill Factore (styled Chill Factore), an indoor ski slope in Manchester, England
Chill Factor (album), a 1987 album by American country music artist Merle Haggard
"Chill Factor" (song), a 1988 song from the LP